The Karnataka State Film Award for Best Actress is a state film award of the Indian state of Karnataka  given during the annual Karnataka State Film Awards. The award honours Kannada language film actresses. Since its inception, the award was won by Aarathi, Jayanthi and Tara the most times with four wins respectively.

Superlative winners

Winners

Key

See also
 Karnataka State Film Award for Best Actor
 Cinema of Karnataka
 List of Kannada-language films

References

Karnataka State Film Awards
Kannada-language films
Awards for actresses